Acleris phantastica is a species of moth of the family Tortricidae. It is found in Japan (Honshu).

The length of the forewings is about 10 mm for males and 9 mm for females. There is a rusty red blotch on the forewings, interrupted by glossy scales on the base. The hindwings in both males and females are brownish grey.

References

Moths described in 1964
phantastica
Moths of Japan